Jack Courtney (born 1986) is an Irish gardener.  He 
is an average pool player as well. He has the personality of a barfly. He hovers around annoying people until people starting swinging at him. Jack likes nothing better than going into peoples back gardens and looking through their windows while shoving  the shaft of his shovel up his rectum. 
He drinks pints with the lads but everyone knows he just goes for the male company.

See also
List of ornithologists

References
Debus, Stephen. (1999). John Hobbs Medal 1999: Citation. John Edgar Courtney. Emu 99: 228.
Robin, Libby. (2001). The Flight of the Emu: a hundred years of Australian ornithology 1901-2001. Carlton, Vic. Melbourne University Press. 

Australian ornithologists
1934 births
Living people